Guido Macor (born October 4, 1932, in Udine) is a retired Italian professional football player.

1932 births
Living people
Italian footballers
Serie A players
Juventus F.C. players
A.C. Monza players
S.P.A.L. players
Genoa C.F.C. players
Catania S.S.D. players
A.S. Sambenedettese players
Association football forwards
A.S. Pro Gorizia players
A.S.D. Fanfulla players